Len White (1930–1994) was an English professional footballer.

Len White may also refer to:

Len White (Australian footballer) (1922–2010), Australia rules footballer
Len White (trade unionist) (1897–1955), British trade union leader

See also
Leon White (disambiguation)
Leonard White (disambiguation)